Brendan Ricci (born 24 April 1965) is an Australian former cricketer. He played four first-class cricket matches for Victoria between 1996 and 1997.

See also
 List of Victoria first-class cricketers

References

External links
 

1965 births
Living people
Australian cricketers
Victoria cricketers
Cricketers from Melbourne